Nripendra Narayan Government High School is a secondary school located in Debiganj, Debiganj Upazila, Panchagarh District, Bangladesh. It was founded in 1906 by Maharaja Nripendra Narayan. This school is also known as  Debiganj N.N.Govt.High School  (N.N School). Secondary School Certificate examination under Dinajpur Education Board.

History
Nripendra Narayan Government High School is founded on 1906 by Nripendra Narayan Bhup Bahadur, Maharaja of Cooch Behar. The school was founded on the east bank of Korotoya River. In the beginning it was named Nripendra Narayan English School. But after few years it's changed to Bangla version. At that time it was one of the famous schools in Jalpaiguri District. Student also came here from Asam, Cooch Beher, Jalpaiguri & Darjiling. There were two residential boarding for the student. One was for the Muslim students & other was for the Hindu students. Then for some problems the authority closed those boardings. And for this reason students stopped to come here from long distance. But the local students continued to study here. In the year of 1987 after being a government school its name changed to Nripendra Narayan Government High School which is also known as N.N Govt. High School. And now the school becomes a famous school in Panchagarh District of Independent Bangladesh.

References

Schools in Panchagarh District
Dinajpur Education Board
High schools in Bangladesh
Educational institutions established in 1906
1906 establishments in India